Biotech Week is a weekly biotechnology and pharmaceutical trade magazine. The magazine was established in 1999. It is published by NewsRX. The magazine covers a broad range of medical issues and financial related information about companies in these industries. The magazine is headquartered in Atlanta, Georgia.

References

External links
 
 

1999 establishments in Georgia (U.S. state)
English-language magazines
Magazines established in 1999
Magazines published in Atlanta
Medical magazines
Professional and trade magazines
Science and technology magazines published in the United States
Weekly magazines published in the United States